This article contains information about the literary events and publications of 1520.

Events
unknown dates
Scholars at Complutense University, Alcalá de Henares, under the direction of Diego Lopez de Zúñiga, complete the Complutensian Polyglot Bible.
Ulrich von Hutten's satirical poem Aufwecker der teutschen Nation (Awakener of the German Nation) is published – his earliest work in German.

New books

Prose
Hochstratus Ovans
Martin Luther
To the Christian Nobility of the German Nation (An den christlichen Adel deutscher Nation)
On the Babylonian Captivity of the Church (De captivitate Babylonica ecclesiae praeludium)
On the Freedom of a Christian
Niccolò Machiavelli – Discourse on Reforming the Government of Florence (Discorso sopra il riformare lo stato di Firenze)
Shin Maha Thilawuntha – Yazawin Kyaw (Burmese), supplement
Ruyijun zhuan (claimed completion date)

Drama
John Heywood – Johan Johan The Husband
Approximate year – Niccolò Machiavelli: Andria

Poetry

Robert Copland –  (published in London by Wynkyn de Worde)
Terence (translated) – Terens in Englysh (published in Paris)
Approximate year
John Lydgate – Testament
Alexander the Great
The Squire of Low Degree (written c. 1500; published in London by Wynkyn de Worde)

Births
March 3 – Matthias Flacius, German Lutheran theologian (died 1575)
unknown date 
François Baudouin, French humanist historian (died 1573)
Natalis Comes, Italian mythologist, poet and historian (died 1582)
Denis Lambin, French classicist (died 1572)
probable
Hernando de Acuña, Spanish poet (died 1580)
Giovanni Bona de Boliris, Italian humanist, poet and writer, writing in Latin and Italian (died 1572)
Thomas Churchyard, English author and poet (died 1604)
Pernette Du Guillet, French poet (died 1545)
Jorge de Montemor, Portuguese novelist and poet, writing in Spanish (died 1561)
Christophe Plantin, French-born Dutch humanist and printer (died 1589)
Madeleine Des Roches (Madeleine Neveu), French author, poet and salonnière (died 1587)
Alexander Scott, Scottish poet (died 1582/83)
Georg Thym, German teacher, poet and writer (died 1560)

Deaths
March 16 – Martin Waldseemüller, German humanist and cartographer (born c.1470)
May 31 – Johannes Aesticampianus, German humanist theologian (born 1457)
unknown date – William Dunbar, Scottish poet (born 1459/60)

References

1520

1520 books
Years of the 16th century in literature